Rotorua Central is the central business district and central suburb of Rotorua, in the Bay of Plenty region of New Zealand's North Island.

Demographics

Rotorua Central had a population of 537 at the 2018 New Zealand census, an increase of 9 people (1.7%) since the 2013 census, and an increase of 66 people (14.0%) since the 2006 census. There were 228 households, comprising 276 males and 264 females, giving a sex ratio of 1.05 males per female. The median age was 34.1 years (compared with 37.4 years nationally), with 42 people (7.8%) aged under 15 years, 168 (31.3%) aged 15 to 29, 255 (47.5%) aged 30 to 64, and 75 (14.0%) aged 65 or older.

Ethnicities were 38.5% European/Pākehā, 25.7% Māori, 3.4% Pacific peoples, 40.8% Asian, and 2.8% other ethnicities. People may identify with more than one ethnicity.

The percentage of people born overseas was 51.4, compared with 27.1% nationally.

Although some people chose not to answer the census's question about religious affiliation, 40.8% had no religion, 35.8% were Christian, 1.1% had Māori religious beliefs, 11.7% were Hindu, 1.7% were Muslim, 1.7% were Buddhist and 3.9% had other religions.

Of those at least 15 years old, 144 (29.1%) people had a bachelor's or higher degree, and 45 (9.1%) people had no formal qualifications. The median income was $25,300, compared with $31,800 nationally. 60 people (12.1%) earned over $70,000 compared to 17.2% nationally. The employment status of those at least 15 was that 261 (52.7%) people were employed full-time, 75 (15.2%) were part-time, and 33 (6.7%) were unemployed.

Economy

Retail

The Rotorua Central mall opened in 1995. It has 55 tenants, including The Warehouse, Harvey Norman, Countdown, Farmers, Briscoes, Rebel Sport and Smiths City.

References

Suburbs of Rotorua
Central business districts in New Zealand
Populated places on Lake Rotorua